Kildare North is a parliamentary constituency represented in Dáil Éireann, the lower house of the Irish parliament or Oireachtas. The constituency elects 4 deputies (Teachtaí Dála, commonly known as TDs) on the system of proportional representation by means of the single transferable vote (PR-STV).

History and boundaries 
The constituency was created at the 1997 general election, when the former 5-seat Kildare constituency was divided into Kildare North and Kildare South. At the 1997 and 2002 elections, Kildare North was a 3-seat constituency, but it was allocated an extra seat at the 2007 general election. The constituency spans the more densely populated north-eastern corner of County Kildare, taking in the towns of Celbridge, Clane, Leixlip, Maynooth and Naas.

The Electoral (Amendment) (Dáil Constituencies) Act 2017 defines the constituency as:

TDs

Elections

2020 general election

2016 general election

2011 general election

2007 general election

2005 by-election

2002 general election

1997 general election

See also
Elections in the Republic of Ireland
Politics of the Republic of Ireland
List of Dáil by-elections
List of political parties in the Republic of Ireland

References

Dáil constituencies
Politics of County Kildare
1997 establishments in Ireland
Constituencies established in 1997